The 1947 Amateur World Series was held from November 29 through December 20 in Barranquilla, Colombia. It was the 9th Amateur World Series. The Cuban national team sat out and the competition only consisted of other Caribbean, Central American and South American teams. Thus, host Colombia won its first title.

Final standings

References

Baseball World Cup, 1947
Baseball World Cup
1947
Amateur World Series
Sport in Barranquilla